John Robert Arthur Dowd AO KC (born 12 November 1940), is a former leader of the Liberal Party of Australia in New South Wales. He was the Chancellor of Southern Cross University between 2002 and 2014, and the President of ActionAid Australia, an international aid organisation.

Early years and background
Dowd was educated at Fort Street High School and the University of Sydney where he graduated with a LLB. Before entering Parliament, he was admitted to the New South Wales Bar in 1967. Dowd later was admitted to the Bar of Ireland and became a member of the King's Inns in Dublin.

Political career
He was a member of the Liberal Party, and the member for Lane Cove in the New South Wales Legislative Assembly from 1975 to 1991. He served as Opposition Leader from 1981, elected as Leader shortly after that year's election, until 1983 when he was deposed by Nick Greiner.

The 1981 election had seen Dowd's predecessor Bruce McDonald defeated in the seat he was contesting and the Liberals winning the same number of seats as its Coalition partner, the National Country Party. The Liberal Party leader has always been the leader of the coalition due to the Liberal Party always having more seats than its coalition partner. The fact that the Liberal Party had won the same number of seats as the National Country Party meant that the now vacant Opposition leadership came under dispute between the new Liberal leader Dowd and National Country Party leader Leon Punch which ultimately went to Dowd.

During Greiner's first term as Premier of New South Wales, Dowd was appointed Attorney General, serving between 1988 and 1991 and also serving as Leader of the House during the same period.

During his term as Attorney-General, important legal reforms in New South Wales were completed including establishment of the Independent Commission Against Corruption and reforms of the criminal, tort and motor accident laws. ICAC is recognized as being the idea of Dowd, which he imported from Hong Kong.

Retiring from Parliament in 1991, Dowd was succeeded as Member for Lane Cove by future Opposition Leader Kerry Chikarovski. He attempted a move to the federal arena when he sought preselection for the 1994 Warringah by-election following the retirement of Michael Mackellar but lost out to future Prime Minister Tony Abbott.

Career as a jurist
Following his retirement from politics, Dowd was appointed to the Supreme Court of New South Wales in 1994, serving until 2004.

At the time of his resignation from the Supreme Court, Dowd blamed personal attacks from Prime Minister John Howard and Premier of New South Wales Bob Carr regarding his opposition to anti-terrorism legislation for his resignation from the bench. Dowd resigned from the bench on 13 August 2004.

In 2002, Dowd served as Chairman of the International Commission of Jurists (ICJ), having been involved with the Australian chapter of the ICJ since 1974. During his time as international chairman, Dowd was involved in missions including to Hong Kong in 1991, East Timor in 2000 and Nepal in 2003. In 1997, he led the Australian government delegation to monitor Palestinian Legislative Council elections and procedures.

Community service
In 2002, Dowd was elected as the Chancellor of Southern Cross University, serving until his retirement in 2014. In 2005, he was appointed Protection Ambassador for ActionAid Australia (previously called AUSTCARE), and became a Director of the organisation in 2008 and President in 2009. In May 2011, Dowd launched The Justice Campaign in a show of support for human rights and justice with a focus on alleged abuses at Guantanamo Bay, Abu Ghraib and elsewhere, and a particular focus on David Hicks.

He is a member of the Australian Club in Sydney.

References

 

Living people
1940 births
Members of the New South Wales Legislative Assembly
Liberal Party of Australia members of the Parliament of New South Wales
Officers of the Order of Australia
Leaders of the Opposition in New South Wales
Australian King's Counsel
Southern Cross University people
Attorneys General of New South Wales